Sergei Smirnov is a Russian former pair skater. With partner Elena Tobiash, he placed seventh at the 1993 European Championships in Helsinki.

Competitive highlights 
(with Tobiash)

References 

Russian male pair skaters
Living people
Year of birth missing (living people)